Kimena Brog-Meier (born 20 February 1987) is a Swiss former competitive figure skater. She is the 2002 Swiss national champion and won a silver medal on the ISU Junior Grand Prix. She qualified to the free skate at three ISU Championships – 2001 Junior Worlds in Sofia, Bulgaria; 2002 Junior Worlds in Hamar, Norway; and 2003 Europeans in Malmö, Sweden.

Programs

Results

References

External links
 

Swiss female single skaters
1987 births
Living people
Figure skaters from Zürich